The cheek is the area of the face below the eyes and between the nose and the left or right ear.

Cheek may also refer to:

Places
 Cheek, Oklahoma, United States
 Cheek, Texas, United States
 Cheek Creek, Missouri, United States
 Cheeks Hill, a hill on Axe Edge Moor, Peak District, England

People
 Cheek (rapper) (born 1981), Finnish rapper
 Cheek (surname)
 Mr. Cheeks or Terrance Kelly (born 1971), an American rapper

Other uses
 Cheek (casting), an addition to a casting flask used to produce reentrant angles
 Cheek, a slang term for the buttocks
 The Cheek, a British indie pop band

See also
 Cheek to Cheek (disambiguation)
 Cheekh, a 2019 Pakistani crime-drama television series
 Cheeks (disambiguation)
 Cheeky (disambiguation)
 Chic (disambiguation)
 Tongue-in-cheek (disambiguation)